Samuel Southey Hinds (April 4, 1875 – October 13, 1948) was an American actor and former lawyer. He was often cast as kindly authority figures and appeared in more than 200 films in a career lasting 22 years.

Early years 
Hinds was born in Brooklyn, New York, the son of Joseph E. Hinds and Mary A. Beetham Hinds.  He was the great-grandson of poet Robert Southey. His father was the president of the United States Playing Card Company,

He was a graduate of Phillips Andover Academy, Harvard Law School, and New York University Law School and worked for more than 32 years as a lawyer before becoming a professional actor. After he lost most of his money in the financial crisis of 1929, Hinds retired as a lawyer and joined the Pasadena Community Playhouse. He started acting in Broadway shows at age 54.

Career 
Hinds is perhaps best remembered for playing Peter Bailey, the father of James Stewart and founder of the Bailey Building and Loan, in It's a Wonderful Life (1946) and for his part as Paul Sycamore in You Can't Take It with You (1938), both films directed by Frank Capra. Hinds was also known for his roles in the Abbott & Costello films such as Buck Privates (1941), Ride 'Em Cowboy (1942) and Pardon My Sarong (1942). He also portrayed Lew Ayres' father in the Dr. Kildare film series during the early 1940s. Hinds mostly played supporting roles, often kind and dignified authority figures; often lawyers, doctors, mayors, judges or the father of the main figure.

Hinds' first film was If I Had a Million (1932); his second film was The Road Is Open Again (1933) where he portrayed President Woodrow Wilson. His earlier career was reflected in the role of Judge Thatcher, tortured by the mad Dr. Richard Vollin (Bela Lugosi) in The Raven (1935).

Hinds acted in a total of about 220 films. His last film was The Bribe, released in 1949, after his death.

Death
Hinds died of pneumonia in Pasadena, California, on October 13, 1948 at age 73. He was married to Dorothy Cruickshack. They had two children.

Selected filmography

The Amateur Gentleman (1926) as Charles - Marquis of Jerningham (uncredited) (film debut)
If I Had a Million (1932) as Lawyer (uncredited)
The Crime of the Century (1933) as Philip Ames
Murders in the Zoo (1933) as Banquet Guest (uncredited)
Gabriel Over the White House (1933) as Dr. H.L. Eastman
The Nuisance (1933) as Mr. Beaumont
Bed of Roses (1933) as Father Doran
Deluge (1933) as Chief Forecaster
This Day and Age (1933) as Mayor - George
One Man's Journey (1933) as Dr. Babcock
Lady for a Day (1933) as Mayor (uncredited)
Penthouse (1933) as Stuyvesant - Durant's Law Partner (uncredited)
Berkeley Square (1933) as American Ambassador
 Hold the Press (1933) as R.T. Taylor
Day of Reckoning (1933) as O'Farrell
Fog (1933) as Dickens
Little Women (1933) as Mr. March
The World Changes (1933) as A Banker (uncredited)
Son of a Sailor (1933) as Admiral Farnsworth
The Women in His Life (1933) as Thomas J. Worthing
Convention City (1933) as McAllister
Straightaway (1933)
Let's Fall in Love (1933) as New York Executive (uncredited)
The Big Shakedown (1934) as Kohlsadt - Board Member (uncredited)
Massacre (1934) as Judge Eldridge (uncredited)
You Can't Buy Everything (1934) as Henry - Banking Clerk (uncredited)
The Ninth Guest (1934) as Dr. Murray Reid
The Crime Doctor (1934) as Ballard
No Greater Glory (1934) as Gareb's Grandfather
Men in White (1934) as Dr. Gordon
Sisters Under the Skin (1934) as Winters
Manhattan Melodrama (1934) as Warden of Sing Sing (uncredited)
Sadie McKee (1934) as Dr. Branch (uncredited)
The Most Precious Thing in Life (1934) as Dean (uncredited)
Operator 13 (1934) as Officer Price (uncredited)
Baby, Take a Bow (1934) as Warden (uncredited)
The Defense Rests (1934) as Dean Adams
His Greatest Gamble (1934) as Dr. Owen (uncredited)
Hat, Coat, and Glove (1934) as John Walters (uncredited)
The Cat's-Paw (1934) as Rev. Julian Cobb - Missionary (uncredited)
She Was a Lady (1934) as Mr. Traill (uncredited)
Have a Heart (1934) as Dr. Spear
A Lost Lady (1934) as Jim Sloane
Evelyn Prentice (1934) as Mr. Newton - Party Guest (uncredited)
A Wicked Woman (1934) as Judge (uncredited)
Mills of the Gods (1934) as Burroughs
Sequoia (1934) as Dr. Matthew Martin
West of the Pecos (1934) as Colonel Lambeth
 Behind the Evidence (1935) as J.T. Allen
Bordertown (1935) as Judge at First Trial (uncredited)
Wings in the Dark (1935) as Kennel Club Secretary (uncredited)
Rumba (1935) as Henry B. Harrison
Devil Dogs of the Air (1935) as Fleet Commander (uncredited)
Shadow of Doubt (1935) as Thomas Granby
Law Beyond the Range (1935) as Editor George Alexander (uncredited)
Death Flies East (1935) as Professor Grayson (uncredited)
Living on Velvet (1935) as Henry L. Parker
Private Worlds (1935) as Dr. Arnold
West Point of the Air (1935) as Secretary of War (uncredited)
Black Fury (1935) as Judge (uncredited)
Strangers All (1935) as Charles Green
College Scandal (1935) as Mr. Cummings
The Raven (1935) as Judge Thatcher
She (1935) as John Vincey (uncredited)
Accent on Youth (1935) as Benham (uncredited)
Annapolis Farewell (1935) as Dr. Bryant
The Big Broadcast of 1936 (1935) as Captain
Two-Fisted (1935) as Mr. Pritchard
Dr. Socrates (1935) as Dr. McClintick
Rendezvous (1935) as John Carter
Bad Boy (1935) as Husband (uncredited)
In Person (1935) as Dr. Aaron Sylvester
Millions in the Air (1935) as Colonel Edwards
The Reckless Way (1936)
Timothy's Quest (1936) as Rev. Fellows
The Trail of the Lonesome Pine (1936) as Sheriff
Woman Trap (1936) as Senator Andrews
Fatal Lady (1936) as Guili Ruffano
Border Flight (1936) as Commander Mosely
Rhythm on the Range (1936) as Robert Halloway
His Brother's Wife (1936) as Dr. Claybourne
Sworn Enemy (1936) as Eli Decker
The Longest Night (1936) as Hastings, Store Manager
Love Letters of a Star (1936) as Artemus Todd
Black Legion (1937) as Judge
The Mighty Treve (1937) as Uncle Joel Fenno
She's Dangerous (1937) as Warden
Top of the Town (1937) as Henry Borden
Night Key (1937) as Stephen Ranger
Wings Over Honolulu (1937) as Adm. Furness
The Road Back (1937) as Defense Attorney
Double or Nothing (1937) as Jonathan Clark
The Lady Fights Back (1937) as Judge Cartwright (uncredited)
Stage Door (1937) as Henry Sims
A Girl with Ideas (1937) as Rodding Carter
Navy Blue and Gold (1937) as Richard Gates Sr.
Prescription for Romance (1937) as Major Goddard
The Jury's Secret (1938) as Brandon Williams
Double Danger (1938) as Police Commissioner David Theron
Forbidden Valley (1938) as Jeff Hazzard
Test Pilot (1938) as General Ross
The Devil's Party (1938) as Justice Harrison
Wives Under Suspicion (1938) as David Marrow
The Rage of Paris (1938) as Mr. William Duncan Sr.
Little Tough Guy (1938) as 1st Judge (voice, uncredited)
The Road to Reno (1938) as Sylvia's Attorney
You Can't Take It with You (1938) as Paul Sycamore
Personal Secretary (1938) as Alan Lemke
Swing That Cheer (1938) as Coach McGann
Young Dr. Kildare (1938) as Dr. Stephen Kildare
The Storm (1938) as Capt. Kenny
Little Tough Guys in Society (1938) as Judge (uncredited)
Secrets of a Nurse (1938) as Judge Corrigan
Newsboys' Home (1938) as Howard Price Dutton
Pirates of the Skies (1939) as Police Commissioner
Within the Law (1939) as Mr. Gilder
Calling Dr. Kildare (1939) as Dr. Stephen Kildare
 Ex-Champ (1939) as Boxing Commissioner Edward P. Nash
Career (1939) as Clem Bartholomew
The Under-Pup (1939) as Dr. McKay
Hawaiian Nights (1939) as Lane
Tropic Fury (1939) as J.P. Waterford
Rio (1939) as Lamartine
Hero for a Day (1939) as 'Dutch' Bronson
One Hour to Live (1939) as Commissioner Cromwell
First Love (1939) as Mr. Parker
The Secret of Dr. Kildare (1939) as Dr. Stephen Kildare
Destry Rides Again (1939) as Judge Slade
Charlie McCarthy, Detective (1939) as Court Aldrich
Zanzibar (1940) as Dale
It's a Date (1940) as Sidney Simpson
Dr. Kildare's Strange Case (1940) as Dr. Stephen Kildare
Ski Patrol (1940) as Captain Per Vallgren
The Boys from Syracuse (1940) as Angeen
Dr. Kildare Goes Home (1940) as Dr. Stephen Kildare
Spring Parade (1940) as Von Zimmel
A Little Bit of Heaven (1940) as Doctor (uncredited)
I'm Nobody's Sweetheart Now (1940) as George P. Morgan
Seven Sinners (1940) as Governor 
Trail of the Vigilantes (1940) as George Preston
Buck Privates (1941) as Major General Emerson
Back Street (1941) as Felix Darren
Man Made Monster (1941) as Dr. John Lawrence
The Lady from Cheyenne (1941) as Governor Howard
Adventure in Washington (1941) as Senator Henry Owen
Tight Shoes  (1941) as Horace Grover, 'the Brain'
Blossoms in the Dust (1941) as Mr. Kahly
The Shepherd of the Hills (1941) as Andy Beeler
Dr. Kildare's Wedding Day (1941) as Dr. Stephen Kildare
Unfinished Business (1941) as Uncle
Badlands of Dakota (1941) as Wilbur Grayson (uncredited)
Mob Town (1941) as Judge Luther Bryson
Road Agent (1941) as Banker Sam Leavitt
Hellzapoppin' (1941) as Showboat Captain (uncredited)
Don Winslow of the Navy (1942, Serial) as Admiral Colby, The CINC-US [Ch. 1]
Jail House Blues (1942) as Mr. Thomas Daniels
Frisco Lil (1942) as James Brewster
Ride 'Em Cowboy (1942) as Sam Shaw
The Strange Case of Doctor Rx (1942) as Dudley Crispin
Kid Glove Killer (1942) as Mayor Daniels
The Spoilers (1942) as Judge Horace Stillman
Grand Central Murder (1942) as Roger Furness
Lady in a Jam (1942) as Doctor Brewster
Pardon My Sarong (1942) as Chief Kolua
Pittsburgh (1942) as Morgan Prentiss 
Hi, Buddy (1943) as Army Commander (uncredited)
Keep 'Em Slugging (1943) as Carruthers
It Ain't Hay (1943) as Col. Brainard
He's My Guy (1943) as Johnson
Follow the Band (1943) as Pop Turnbull
Good Morning, Judge (1943) as J.P. Gordon
Mister Big (1943) as Jeremy Taswell
Hers to Hold (1943) as Dr. Crane
We've Never Been Licked (1943) as Col. Jason Craig
Fired Wife (1943) as Judge Towne
Larceny with Music (1943) as Brewster
Top Man (1943) as Mr. Fairchild
Son of Dracula (1943) as Judge Simmons
Sing a Jingle (1944) as J.P. Crane
Phantom Lady (1944) as Judge (voice, uncredited)
Chip Off the Old Block (1944) as Dean Manning
Ladies Courageous (1944) as Brig. Gen. Wade
The Great Alaskan Mystery (1944) as Herman Brock [Chs. 3-13]
Follow the Boys (1944) as Officer (uncredited)
Cobra Woman (1944) as Father Paul
Jungle Woman (1944) as Coroner
South of Dixie (1944) as Col. Andrew J. Morgan
The Singing Sheriff (1944) as Seth
Frisco Sal (1945) as Doc
I'll Remember April (1945) as Garrett Garfield
Escape in the Desert (1945) as Gramp
Swing Out, Sister (1945) as Rufus Mariman
Secret Agent X-9 (1945) as Solo
Lady on a Train (1945) as Mr. Wiggam
The Strange Affair of Uncle Harry (1945) as Dr. Adams
Men in Her Diary (1945) as Judge Bergen
Week-End at the Waldorf (1945) as Mr. Jessup
Scarlet Street (1945) as Charles Pringle
Blonde Alibi (1946) as Prof. Slater
Strange Conquest (1946) as Dr. Graves
The Runaround (1946) as Norman Hampton
Inside Job (1946) as Judge Kincaid
Danger Woman (1946) as Dean Albert Sears
Little Miss Big (1946) as Wilfred Elliott
White Tie and Tails (1946) as Mr. Bradford
It's a Wonderful Life (1946) as Peter "Pa" Bailey
The Egg and I (1947) as Sheriff
Time Out of Mind (1947) as Dr. Weber
Slave Girl (1947) as Senator Claibourne (uncredited)
Call Northside 777 (1948) as Judge Charles Moulton (uncredited)
Perilous Waters (1948) as Dana Ferris
The Return of October (1948) as Judge Northridge
The Boy with Green Hair (1948) as Dr. Knudson 
The Bribe (1949) as Dr. Warren (final film role)

References

External links 

1875 births
1948 deaths
American male film actors
Harvard Law School alumni
Deaths from pneumonia in California
People from Brooklyn
American people of English descent
20th-century American male actors
Phillips Academy alumni
New York University School of Law alumni